The 2006–07 North Texas men's basketball team represented the University of North Texas in the 2006–07 college basketball season. The team was led by head coach Johnny Jones. In addition to setting a new school-record with 23 wins, the Mean Green won its first Sun Belt Conference title and advanced for only the second time to the NCAA Division I men's basketball tournament. The Mean Green played their home games on campus at the Super Pit in Denton, Texas.

Roster

*Not eligible to compete in a game until the 2007–08 season due to NCAA transferring rules

Schedule

|-
!colspan=9| Exhibition

|-
!colspan=9| Regular season

|-
!colspan=9| 2007 Sun Belt men's basketball tournament

|-
!colspan=9| 2007 NCAA Division I men's basketball tournament

North Texas Mean Green men's basketball seasons
North Texas
North Texas Mean Green men's basketball team
North Texas Mean Green men's basketball team
North Texas